The following is a list of ice hockey teams in Prince Edward Island, past and present. It includes the league(s) they play for, and championships won.

Minor Professional

American Hockey League

Junior

Quebec Major Junior Hockey League

Maritime Junior A Hockey League

Junior B Hockey Leagues

Junior C Hockey Leagues

Semi-professional, senior and amateur

Senior

University

League, regional and national championships

See also

Hockey PEI

References

Prince Edward Island teams

Ice hockey teams
Ice hockey teams in Prince Edward Island